This is a season-by-season list of records compiled by Colorado College in men's ice hockey.

Colorado College has won in its history two Division I NCAA Men's Ice Hockey Championships: in 1950 and 1957 . Colorado College never missed a season of play since 1938 except during World War II.

Season-by-season results

Note: GP = Games played, W = Wins, L = Losses, T = Ties

* Winning percentage is used when conference schedules are unbalanced.bold and italic are program records

Footnotes

References

 
Lists of college men's ice hockey seasons in the United States
Colorado sports-related lists